The canton of Marnay is an administrative division of the Haute-Saône department, northeastern France. Its borders were modified at the French canton reorganisation which came into effect in March 2015. Its seat is in Marnay.

It consists of the following communes:
 
Arsans
Autoreille
Avrigney-Virey
Bard-lès-Pesmes
Bay
Beaumotte-lès-Pin
Bonboillon
Bonnevent-Velloreille
Bresilley
Broye-Aubigney-Montseugny
Brussey
Bucey-lès-Gy
Chambornay-lès-Pin
Chancey
Charcenne
Chaumercenne
Chenevrey-et-Morogne
Chevigney
Choye
Citey
Courcuire
Cugney
Cult
Étuz
Gézier-et-Fontenelay
La Grande-Résie
Gy
Hugier
Lieucourt
Malans
Marnay
Montagney
Montboillon
Motey-Besuche
Pesmes
Pin
La Résie-Saint-Martin
Sauvigney-lès-Pesmes
Sornay
Tromarey
Vadans
Valay
Vantoux-et-Longevelle
Velleclaire
Vellefrey-et-Vellefrange
Velloreille-lès-Choye
Venère
Villefrancon
Villers-Chemin-et-Mont-lès-Étrelles
Vregille

References

Cantons of Haute-Saône